Lucius Calpurnius Bestia may refer to:
 Lucius Calpurnius Bestia (consul)
 Lucius Calpurnius Bestia (tribune 62 BC)